Vodoley Rock is the rock extending  in northwest–southeast direction and  wide in Barclay Bay on the west side of Ioannes Paulus II Peninsula on Livingston Island in the South Shetland Islands, Antarctica.  The area was visited by early 19th century sealers operating on nearby Byers Peninsula and Cape Shirreff.

The feature is named after the settlement of Vodoley in northern Bulgaria.

Location

See also 
 Composite Antarctic Gazetteer
 List of Antarctic islands south of 60° S
 SCAR
 Territorial claims in Antarctica

Maps
 L.L. Ivanov et al. Antarctica: Livingston Island and Greenwich Island, South Shetland Islands. Scale 1:100000 topographic map. Sofia: Antarctic Place-names Commission of Bulgaria, 2005.
 L.L. Ivanov. Antarctica: Livingston Island and Greenwich, Robert, Snow and Smith Islands. Scale 1:120000 topographic map.  Troyan: Manfred Wörner Foundation, 2009.  
Antarctic Digital Database (ADD). Scale 1:250000 topographic map of Antarctica. Scientific Committee on Antarctic Research (SCAR). Since 1993, regularly upgraded and updated.

Notes

References
Vodoley Rock. SCAR Composite Antarctic Gazetteer.
 Bulgarian Antarctic Gazetteer. Antarctic Place-names Commission. (details in Bulgarian, basic data in English)

External links
 Vodoley Rock. Copernix satellite image

Rock formations of Livingston Island
Bulgaria and the Antarctic